is a 1998 Japanese experimental coming-of-age film directed and co-written by Hideaki Anno, based on the novel Topaz II by Ryū Murakami. It was Anno's first live action feature-length film. The film was shot almost entirely on hand-held digital cameras and contains some very unusual camera work, including many different mounted camera positions, such as on a model train riding on tracks. The film also flips from widescreen to fullscreen, distorts (with effects such as a fisheye lens), confuses, and makes use of overlays stacked in layers to convey the character's emotions.

An official English-language DVD was released in 2004 by Kino on Video.

Plot
The film follows four Japanese high school girls who engage in enjo-kōsai, or compensated dating. This is a practice in Japan where older businessmen pay teenage girls more commonly to simply spend time with them, or for prostitution. The main character, Hiromi, does not have the direction in life that her friends already have. Hiromi's friends were going to buy her a ring, but Hiromi refuses to accept their offer because she does not want her friends to be jealous. Hiromi goes on dates by herself to get money for the ring. Soon, she gets in over her head. Hiromi falls too far into the world of enjo-kōsai as she tries to hold on to a "friends forever" vision of the past.

Personnel
 Director: Hideaki Anno
 Original story: Ryū Murakami
 Script: Akio Satsukawa

Cast
 Asumi Miwa - 
 Kirari - 
 Hirono Kudō - 
 Yukie Nakama - 
 Mitsuru Hirata - Kagegawa
 Mitsuru Fukikoshi - Yoshimura
 Moro Morooka - Yazaki
 Tooru Tezuka - Uehara
 Ikkei Watanabe - Kobayashi
 Tadanobu Asano - Captain EO
 Kotono Mitsuishi - Radio DJ (voice)
 Akira Ishida - Yoshio (voice)
 Megumi Hayashibara - Telephone Dialing Voice
 Nana Okada - Hiromi's Mother
 Leo Morimoto - Hiromi's Father

DVD variations
An SR-Ban version was released in Japan on 24 July 2003. Apparently, it is the director's cut, has two minutes of extra footage and has been transferred directly from the original tape, whilst the American and Japanese DVDs appear to come from a different source. The American version appears to be the original interlaced version, whilst the Japanese, non-director's cut, appears to have been de-interlaced and given the impression of a pseudo-progressive style. Both non-director's cuts have more subdued colors, whilst the director's cut is more vivid and the motion is fluid.
This fluidity in motion is due to the 60 fps high frame rate, compared to the normal 24 fps frame rates on the non SR-Ban DVDs.

References

External links
 
 Love & Pop at Kino Video
 Into at Gainax
 Cast list at Gainax

1998 films
1990s Japanese-language films
Japanese avant-garde and experimental films
Films directed by Hideaki Anno
Films with screenplays by Hideaki Anno
Toei Company films
1990s teen films
1990s coming-of-age films
Films based on Japanese novels
Films scored by Shinkichi Mitsumune
1990s Japanese films